Germany was represented by Conny Froboess, with the song '"Zwei kleine Italiener", at the 1962 Eurovision Song Contest, which took place on 18 March in Luxembourg City. Twelve artists and 24 songs took part in the German preselection, which consisted of four semi-finals, followed by the final on 17 February. Each show was held in a different German city.

There were several past and future Eurovision representatives among the participants: Wyn Hoop (Germany 1960), Siw Malmkvist (Sweden 1960 & Germany 1969), Jimmy Makulis (Austria 1961), Carmela Corren (Austria 1963) and Margot Eskens (Germany 1966).

Before Eurovision

National final

Semi-finals
Four semi-finals were held to select the 12 qualifiers for the final. Each artist performed two songs and a jury selected which of the two should go forward to the final.

Semi-final 1 - Frankfurt

Semi-final 2 - Stuttgart

Semi-final 3 - Cologne

Semi-final 4 - Munich

Final
The national final was held on 17 February at the Kurhaus in Baden-Baden, hosted by Klaus Havenstein. The winning song was chosen by voting from six regional juries and an additional jury in the theatre.

At Eurovision 
On the night of the final Froboess performed 7th in the running order, following Sweden and preceding the Netherlands. "Zwei kleine Italiener" was one of very few fun, uptempo songs in what in retrospect is usually rated as one of the dreariest contests of all. Each national jury awarded 3-2-1 to their top three songs, and at the close of voting "Zwei kleine Italiener" had received 9 points, placing Germany 6th of the 16 entries. The German jury awarded its 3 points to contest winners France.

Voting

References 

1962
Countries in the Eurovision Song Contest 1962
Eurovision